Morrenia is a genus of flowering plants in the family Apocynaceae, first described as a genus in 1838. It is native to South America.

Species

homonym 
Morrenia odorata Hort. ex D.G. Kuntze not (Hook. & Arn.) Lindl. now  Mikania glomerata

References

Asclepiadoideae
Apocynaceae genera